TSS Golfito was a  passenger-carrying banana boat of the Fyffes Line, a fleet of ships owned and operated by the UK banana importer Elders and Fyffes Limited.

History
She was built in 1949 by Alexander Stephen and Sons of Glasgow and scrapped at Faslane in 1972.

Accommodation
She had three passenger decks with cabins for 94 first class passengers, public rooms and open-air deck spaces. These were centred between four large refrigerated cargo holds, two forward and two aft, that could handle 140,000 stems (1,750 tons) of bananas.

Trade
Her main trade was general cargo outwards (mostly British manufactured goods), returning with bananas.

Routing
She was routed on 4-5 week voyages from Southampton or Avonmouth in England to Barbados, Trinidad and up to five ports on Jamaica (Kingston, Port Antonio, Montego Bay, Oracabessa and Bowden) where bananas were loaded through the cool of the night.

Sister ship
In 1956 she was joined by a sister ship, . Together they provided a regular fortnightly service between the UK and the Caribbean.

Notes and references

See also
The Ships List: Elders & Fyffes.

1948 ships
Ships built on the River Clyde
Banana boats
Merchant ships of the United Kingdom